Roberts Center was a 4,400-seat multi-purpose arena in Chestnut Hill, Massachusetts, United States. It opened in 1958 and was home to the Boston College Eagles men's basketball and women's basketball teams until the Conte Forum opened in 1988.

References

Sports venues completed in 1958
Boston College Eagles basketball venues
Defunct indoor arenas in Massachusetts
Defunct college basketball venues in the United States
Defunct sports venues in Boston
Basketball venues in Massachusetts